"Whistle" is a song by Australian recording artist and songwriter Kylie Minogue, in collaboration with the Icelandic band múm, for the motion picture Jack & Diane, in which Minogue is also featured. It is the main track for the motion picture, which premiered in 2012.

The song received favorable reviews from music critics, who felt the song was a calm warm track, along with the comparisons with Björk.

Background
In early 2012, it was confirmed that Minogue would feature in the American independent film Jack & Diane, which also stars actress Juno Temple. According to Gunnar Örn Tynes from the band múm (who Minogue collaborates with on the song) stated; "This is not the typical pop song that we could write Minogue, but we preferred to write the piece with the film in mind [...]"

Critical reception
"Whistle" received positive reviews from most music critics. A French publication stated that the song is a "dark, warm vocal performance." Sal Cinquemani from Slant Magazine stated "The track is six minutes of fluttery, Björk-style drum programming and sparkly synth sounds accompanied by plucky orchestral flourishes and Kylie's breathless vocals and often indecipherable lyrics. It begins, "I bleed like a pig/It's not so unusual," over what sounds like digital droplets of freezing rain gently colliding with wind chimes. And then it gets weird."

Robbie Daw from Idolator stated that "Kylie Minogue has always demonstrated an ability to turn out a quirky collaboration [...] Now she can add experimental electronic act mum to her dance card, following their pair-up on Jack And Diane soundtrack song “Whistle”." He carried on saying "As you can hear, the touching track itself is all mum, with the Icelandic band offering up electric squiggles and glitches swathed in strings [...]"

Format and track listing
This is the format and track listing of major single release of "Whistle".

Digital download
Whistle – 6:06

Release history

References

2012 songs
2013 singles
Kylie Minogue songs
Parlophone singles
Songs written for films